DYSO-FM (105.7 FM) branded as 105.7 Radyo Natin Hinigaran is a music FM radio station which owned by Manila Broadcasting Company that broadcasts from JMV Broadcasting Complex, Moonrise Village, Barangay 3, Hinigaran, Negros Occidental in the Philippines.

Broadcasting with a power of 500 Watts from 4:00 AM to 12:00 MN. It is the first FM station in Hinigaran, Negros Occidental, Philippines.

History
On December 16, 1997, MBC launched Radyo Natin. Composed of 100 FM stations strategically across the nation by using state of the art satellite technology, Radyo Natin is able to reach audiences that has never been reached before by another radio station.

Awards
Radyo Natin has been awarded as the Best Provincial FM Station in the Philippines for 3 consecutive years on the 21st, 22nd and 23rd KBP Golden Dove Awards (2012, 2013 and 2014).

Adult contemporary radio stations in the Philippines
Radio stations established in 1997
Radyo Natin Network stations
Radio stations in Negros Occidental